The Achimota Retail Centre is a shopping centre located at Dome near the St. John's Grammar School, along the Accra—Nsawam Highway in the  Greater Accra Region of Ghana. The shopping centre is owned by Delico Achimota Limited, the same group that is the majority shareholder of West Hills Mall.

History
The construction of the mall began in April 2014 and was completed in October 2015 (exactly 18 months after). The edifice was opened to the public on 29 October 2015.

Facility 
The structure is a US$60 million investment which sits on a total land area of 35,790m² of which 14 622m² constitutes the trading space. It consists of over 45 shops including Shoprite and Palace.

References 

Buildings and structures in Accra
Shopping malls in Ghana
Shopping malls established in 2015